"Truth (A Great Detective of Love)" is the 13th single by J-pop duo Two-Mix. Released on November 26, 1998, it was the duo's first single under Warner Music Japan, following their split from King Records. Composed by the duo of Shiina Nagano and Minami Takayama, the song was used as the opening theme of episodes 124–142 of the anime TV series Case Closed.

The single peaked at No. 3 on Oricon's weekly singles chart, becoming the duo's highest-charting single and final top-10 single. It sold over 228,710 copies and was the duo's final single to be certified Gold by the RIAJ.

Track listing
All lyrics are written by Shiina Nagano. All music is composed by Minami Takayama. All music is arranged by Two-Mix.

Chart position

Certification

Other versions 
The duo recorded an orchestral ballad version with Orchestre Chimérique on the 1998 self-cover album Baroque Best. An alternate version titled "Truth (Duet with Conan)" on Rhythm Formula features Takayama singing as Conan Edogawa. An English-language version was recorded on the 2000 self-cover album BPM Cube. A remix of the song was included on the 2001 remix album BPM "Dance Unlimited" II.

Cover versions 
 Valshe covered the song on her 2015 album Kimi e no Uso.
 Reol covered the song on her 2015 album Gokusaishoku.
 Nano covered the song on the 2022 various artists album Two-Mix Tribute Album "Crysta-Rhythm".

References

External links 
 
 

1998 singles
1998 songs
Two-Mix songs
Case Closed songs
Japanese-language songs
Warner Music Japan singles
Songs written by Minami Takayama